Hathimera is an old village in the District of Mansehra in Pakistan.

As a voting constituency, it belongs to PK-53 Mansehra. 

The village has one primary school and post office for the many tribes living in Hathimera, including (Sardars )'Awan, Maliks, who are the three major tribes of the village.

Mansehra District
Villages in Pakistan